Christian J. Peter (born October 5, 1972) is a former American football defensive tackle in the National Football League (NFL). Peter's younger brother, Jason, also played in the NFL.

Early years 
Peter grew up the oldest of four children in the Locust section of Middletown Township, New Jersey.

High school 
Peter attended Middletown High School South, where he played one year of football as a junior. The team went undefeated and won the state title in 1990.

College career 
Peter received a full athletic scholarship to the University of Nebraska where he was a three-year starter. He became one of the leaders of Nebraska's feared "Blackshirt" defense. Peter was an all-Big Eight Conference and honorable mention All-American in his senior year, and finished his college career with 124 total tackles, 20 tackles for loss and nine sacks. He was inducted into the Nebraska Football Hall of Fame in 2006.

Arrests and convictions
While attending Nebraska, Peter had several run-ins with the law for various offenses such as threatening a parking attendant while his vehicle was being towed, trespassing, public urination, refusing to comply with police, minor in possession of alcohol, and failure to appear in court. He was convicted four times. [3][4]

In 1993 Peter was accused of groping Natalie Kuijvenhoven (a former Miss Nebraska) in a crowded bar. He pled guilty and was sentenced to 18 months probation, and was suspended for a 1993 exhibition game. Following the 1993 charges from Kuijvenhoven, Kathy Redmond, who attended the University of Nebraska with Peter, came forward and claimed that Peter had sexually assaulted her during their freshman year in 1991. No criminal charges were filed in the matter, but Redmond did file a Title IX suit against the University of Nebraska in 1995; the suit was settled out of court.

In 1994, only a month before the draft, Peter was convicted of disturbing the peace after a woman accused him of grabbing her throat in a Kearney, Nebraska bar. He said he was under the influence during the altercation and admitted to responding in an inexcusable way after she allegedly called him a rapist.

Professional career
Peter was drafted by the New England Patriots in the fifth round of the 1996 NFL Draft. The pick set off a firestorm of criticism from the Boston area press, including Patriots fans and women's groups, as well as Myra Kraft, wife of Patriots owner Robert Kraft.[3] After learning more about Peter's history, the Patriots renounced his rights only a week after the draft. The team said that Peter's behavior was "incompatible with our organization's standards of acceptable conduct."[6] According to The Boston Globe, Myra Kraft personally demanded that the Patriots cut ties with Peter.[3] It was the first time in NFL history that a drafted player had been waived by a team before the start of training camp. Partly due to the backlash, no other team expressed interest. Since then, the Patriots have adopted a zero-tolerance policy for sexual assault.

After the 1996 season, the New York Giants signed Peter as a free agent on condition that he go through counseling for substance abuse, attention deficit disorder, and anger management.[7] He apologized for his behavior while at Nebraska and still speaks about the Giants today as having saved his life. After four years with the Giants, he went on to play with the Indianapolis Colts and the Chicago Bears, where he retired in 2004.

Post playing career
Today, Peter speaks openly of his sobriety, past struggles, and those who have helped him along the way. He travels to schools, businesses, communities, rehabs, and correctional facilities sharing his story in hopes that someone struggling will be helped. Peter currently serves on the board of the Tigger House Foundation, a 501(c) (3) non-profit organization dedicated to achieving a positive impact by reducing the death rate of heroin and opiate addiction.

Peter is currently residing in his home state of New Jersey with his wife and three children. In 2007, he started The Competitive Advantage Companies, a full service insurance brokerage firm based out of Red Bank, NJ.

References

1972 births
Living people
American football defensive tackles
Chicago Bears players
Indianapolis Colts players
Nebraska Cornhuskers football players
New York Giants players
Middletown High School South alumni
Milford Academy alumni
People from Middletown Township, New Jersey
Players of American football from New Jersey
Sportspeople from Monmouth County, New Jersey